Vyacheslav Vasilievich Markin (1948 – 1992), known as The Skopinsky Maniac, was a Soviet serial killer, robber, rapist and arsonist who committed 6 brutal murders.

Biography
Markin was born and lived in Leningrad, spending his childhood in a communal apartment. He never met his father, and was cold towards his mother. He also did not have any friends among his peers.

Markin committed his first theft at school - he was running late for class and, passing by the empty teacher's room, he saw someone's open bag, and in it - a purse in which there was money. He took the money, left the school, hid it and then returned. Despite the fact that the police were called, the wallet was not found. This pleased Markin, causing him to have a feeling of impunity. A month later, he again committed theft, stealing 120 rubles and giving them to his mother, claiming that he had found them on the road. His mother did not question it, and soon bought a bike for her son and made a magnificent feast to celebrate.

After some time, he fell out with his mother and ran away from home. Markin began to wander in different cities for a long time. In Dushanbe, he survived by pickpocketing, for which he was caught several times and sent to a colony. He gained experience while imprisoned, and even became somewhat of an "authority", even successfully escaping several times. After one of these escapes, from a colony in Chusovoy in the Perm Oblast, he climbed into an apartment, where he began looking for money. He was caught by the mistress of the house, whom he raped, beat and tied up. Markin was eventually arrested in Kirov for theft, and was soon charged not only with escaping, but with rape. He was sentenced to 14 years imprisonment for everything.

In the colony, he began to quarrel with the local "pahan" Valery 'Ryaby' Ryabchikov. Their confrontation led to a fight, in which Ryabchikov beat Markin. Learning that his opponent was preparing for an escape, Markin informed the colony's authorities of this. As a result, ''Ryaby" was thrown to the deadline for several years. His people then brutally beat up Markin and threw him out into the cold, but he was miraculously saved by a prisoner who happened to pass by and became his friend after being released.

Murders 
After his release, Markin went to the town of Skopin in Ryazan Oblast, where his fellow colony friend lived. There he met a divorced woman, and they began a romantic relationship. He honestly confessed to her that he had been convicted, but it was due to a false denunciation. They got married, and Markin took his wife's last name. In the city he had a reputation as a decent, working man. He would always tell his wife that he was going on business trips, when in fact he was robbing people's apartments, bringing money and bags full of items home. Soon his wife became pregnant, so Markin committed more and more robberies to keep treating her well. In late 1990, in Ryazan and in Moscow, he was caught at the crime scene by the apartment owners. He beat them and then tied them with special "sea" knots, which got even tighter when they tried to get free. Both victims miraculously survived.

In the spring of 1991 in Ryazan, Markin involuntarily crossed paths with the former cellmate Ryaby Ryabchikov, who was about to kill him. However, everything turned out exactly the opposite, and together with his buddy Markin killed Ryabchikov with particular cruelty, enjoying the process. Then they took the body to the Skopinsky District, threw it near the railway embankment on Skopin-Briquette and unsuccessfully tried to burn it. After that, Markin realized that it was not difficult to commit murder. During a robbery in Ryazan, he killed the apartment's landlady, who found him during the crime. The most terrible crime he committed was a triple murder in the village of Mokhovoye, where his mother-in-law lived. At night, Markin climbed into the house of a neighbor, who had a sister-in-law and a small grandson. Markin tied them up, raped the daughter-in-law, tortured the child to death, and then brutally killed the mother and grandmother, then set the house on fire. In the morning he arrived in Novomichurinsk, climbed into the first apartment he found, and killed the mistress who was present.

While investigating the murder in Mokhovoye, one of the operatives drew attention to the children's swing near the house of Markin's mother-in-law, which had been tied into a sea knot. The same exact knots were found tied to the victims' bodies in Mokhovoye, Ryazan and Novomichurinsk, and the body of Ryabchikov in Skopin. A search was carried out of Markin's wife's apartment, from which stolen items were seized. Markin was soon arrested at a hotel in Ryazan, and in his hotel room were found stolen items from the last murder in Novomichurinsk. His case was led by the famous Ryazan investigator Dmitry Plotkin. Markin remained silent, but soon confessed under the weight of the evidence, talking cold-bloodedly and without regret about the murders. In 1992, when the materials of the case had already been referred to the court, Markin hanged himself in his cell.

In the media 

 Documentary film "The Last Knot" from the series "Criminal Russia".
 Documentary film "The Dead Knot" from the series "Invisible Battle".
 Documentary film "Damn the snuffbox" from the series "The investigation was conducted...".

See also
 List of Russian serial killers

References

External links 
 A serial killer in Ryazan was found thanks to a cunningly knotted children's swing

1949 births
1992 deaths
1992 suicides
Male serial killers
People from Ryazan
Russian murderers of children
Russian rapists
Russian serial killers
Soviet murderers of children
Soviet rapists
Soviet serial killers
Serial killers who committed suicide in prison custody
Suicides by hanging in Russia